is a former Japanese football player and manager. His son Shota Kanno in also former footballer and who is the current head coach WE League club of Nojima Stella Kanagawa.

Playing career
Kanno was born in Kanagawa Prefecture on August 15, 1960. After graduating from high school, he joined Japan Soccer League club Furukawa Electric (later JEF United Ichihara) in 1979. He played many matches from first season. The club won the champions 1985–86 Japan Soccer League, 1982 and 1986 JSL Cup. In 1992, Japan Soccer League was folded and founded new league J1 League. However his opportunity to play decreased and he left the club. He played 210 matches in the league in 15 seasons. In 1994, he joined Japan Football League club Kyoto Purple Sanga. He played in 1 season and retired end of 1994 season.

Coaching career
After retirement, Kanno started coaching career at Kyoto Purple Sanga in 1995. He mainly served as manager for youth team. He moved to Mito HollyHock and served as assistant coach. In July, he became a manager as Hiroshi Kobayashi successor and managed until 2002. He moved to Omiya Ardija in 2003 and served as manager. However the club performance was bad and he was sacked in October. In 2004, he signed with Urawa Reds and became a manager for youth team until August. In 2005, he signed with Shonan Bellmare and became a coach. In June 2006, he became a manager as Eiji Ueda successor and managed until 2008. In 2009, he moved to L.League club TEPCO Mareeze. The club won the 3rd place in 2009 and 2010 season. However the club was disbanded for Fukushima Daiichi nuclear disaster in 2011, he was the last manager for the club. In 2012, he signed with new club Nojima Stella Kanagawa (later Nojima Stella Kanagawa Sagamihara). The club was promoted to Division 2 in 2013 and Division 1 in 2017. The club also won the 2nd place 2017 Empress's Cup. He resigned end of 2018 season.

Club statistics

Managerial statistics

References

External links
 
 

1960 births
Living people
Association football people from Kanagawa Prefecture
Japanese footballers
Japan Soccer League players
J1 League players
Japan Football League (1992–1998) players
JEF United Chiba players
Kyoto Sanga FC players
Japanese football managers
J2 League managers
Mito HollyHock managers
Omiya Ardija managers
Shonan Bellmare managers
Association football midfielders